General (four-star rank) Edson Leal Pujol (Dom Pedrito; born January 2, 1955) is a General in the Brazilian Army. He was the Brazilian Army Commander, from January 2019 to March 2021.

Military career
Pujol graduated in 1977 from the Brazilian Military Academy Academia Militar das Agulhas Negras (AMAN), ranked first in his class in the Cavalry branch. He also achieved first place in his class at the Advanced Course, Escola de Aperfeiçoamento de Oficias (EsAO) and the Command and General Staff School Escola de Comando e Estado-Maior do Exército (Brazil) (ECEME). He has been awarded the silver Hermes medal with three gold crowns.

As a general officer, he commanded the 1st Mechanized Cavalry Brigade, located in Santiago, Rio Grande do Sul and between 25 April 2009 and 29 April 2011 was the Commander of AMAN.

He was appointed by the United Nations Secretary-General as Force Commander of the United Nations Stabilisation Mission in Haiti (MINUSTAH) on 27 March 2013.

In 2018, he was Chief of the Army Science and Technology Department and was appointed by President-elect Jair Bolsonaro to be Brazilian Army Commander.

References

|-

1955 births
Living people
Brazilian generals
United Nations military personnel